The men's club swinging was an artistic gymnastics event held as part of the gymnastics at the 1904 Summer Olympics programme. It was the only time the club swinging event was held, though an "Indian clubs" competition was held at the 1932 Summer Olympics. An unknown number of gymnasts competed, only three are known. The competition was held on Friday, October 28, 1904.

Results

See also 
 Indian club
 Gymnastics at the 1932 Summer_Olympics – Men's Indian clubs

References

Sources
 
 
 

Club swinging